KSHP (1400 AM) is a radio station broadcasting a sports and shopping format. Licensed to North Las Vegas, Nevada, United States, it serves the Las Vegas area.  The station is currently owned by Las Vegas Broadcasting LLC and features programming from Sports Byline USA.

KSHP is an affiliate for sports in 2011 for the BYU Cougars Sports Network and the America's Team Radio Networks Dallas Cowboys. For the 2013 season, KSHP became the official home of the Los Angeles Dodgers.

KSHP AM 1400 is the home of the only daily horse racing handicapping show in Las Vegas, Race Day Las Vegas, hosted by Ralph Siraco.

KSHP features 'SportsBook Radio' and 'Vegas Hockey Hockey' Hotline, hosted by Dana Lane, daily from 10am PT-12pm PT, Monday through Friday. This show is a continuation from the original show, hosted by Brian Blessing for almost a decade. The KSHP studio was renamed the Brian Blessing studio after his passing in 2022. 

KSHP was originally on 1410 kHz and moved to 1400 kHz in 1996.

History
The station went on the air in 1954 as KSHO. On February 1, 1988, the station changed its call sign to KRAM; on April 26, 1995 to KKDD; and on October 29, 1996 to the current KSHP.

References

External links
FCC History Cards for KSHP

 

SHP
SHP
Radio stations established in 1986
1986 establishments in Nevada